Alex Sander (born 1 January 1997) is an Indonesian professional footballer who plays as a goalkeeper for Liga 2 club Kalteng Putra.

Career statistics

Club

Notes

References

External links
 Alex Sander at Soccerway
 Alex Sander at Liga Indonesia

Living people
People from Palembang
West Java sportspeople
Indonesian footballers
Association football goalkeepers
Persela Lamongan players
Liga 1 (Indonesia) players
1997 births